St. Louis Albert Estes (April 2, 1876 – May 2, 1951) was an American medical doctor and proponent of a raw food diet. In 1929, he was credited as being the father and founder of the raw food movement that was sweeping the country. He believed that one of the most common causes of sickness and chronic disease was an unhealthy diet and lifestyle.  Originally a dentist, Estes was unhealthy at the age of thirty and began a raw food diet to improve his health. He later began speaking on the topic in lectures around the country.  Estes also believed in breathing techniques that would achieve maximum absorption of oxygen.  One of his books, Raw Food and Health, published in 1927 is still popular in the Raw, Living Food community today.

Early life and family life
Estes was born in Missouri and died in Los Angeles County, California at age 75 years.  When interviewed for newspaper and magazine articles in the 1920s–1930s he claimed to be approximately 15 years older than records show that he actually was.

Estes was the son of Louis A. and Emma Medora Estes. Estes graduated from Northwestern College of Dentistry. and originally practiced dentistry in Chicago, Illinois. His first wife was Clara Augusta Neimann Estes (1872–1936), and he had three children from this marriage—in birth order, two daughters, Clara Lucille (born c. 1909) and Phoebe Estes (born c. 1911), and a son, St. Louis Estes Jr. (born c. 1913).

Circa 1928, Estes and his second wife (marriage 1922-1923), Esther Moraine Estes (born Esther Moran in Kentucky in 1895), settled in Van Nuys, California at the adobe built Spanish style ranch hacienda located on 10 acres at the corner of Bessemer and Woodman Avenue, which formerly belonged to American actor Noah Beery Sr.

In February 1930, Clara Estes filed suit in Los Angeles County California Superior Court against Estes for $500,000 for desertion and non-support, and for the same dollar amount against "Esther Moran" for alienation of affection. Estes responded that he had obtained a divorce against Clara Estes in Mexico in 1922. The suits were eventually settled out of court.

During the late 1920s through the 1930s, Estes was particularly active with health lecture tours in various cities throughout the United States, including Carnegie Hall in New York City. Mrs. Estes and whatever number of children were generally included in both the promotion and the tour program itself according to newspaper coverage of the day. In addition to his book "Raw Food and Health", Dr. and Mrs. Estes established a company called "Back to Nature", along with a magazine publication by the same name. "Back to Nature" also had a complete line of vitamins (with a photo of the Estes children on the label) and health food products.

In the late 1930s, Estes and his wife moved to San Francisco, California, where their last child, St. Louis Estes VII, was born.  They later returned to Southern California and were residing in Van Nuys, California, at their respective deaths.

In Los Angeles, California, in March 1941 Dr. St. Louis Estes filed for bankruptcy, listing his debts as $245,369 (including an unpaid Federal income tax bill of $104,000), and assets of $4,400 (including $600 worth of health foods).

Estes and his wife had 12 children (six boys and six girls) by 1938, raising them all on a raw food diet from birth. It was decided that Estes would name the boys, which he did as "St. Louis Estes" with the suffix "II" thru "VII". Mrs. Estes named all the girls. The family employed a man by the name of "Prince de Vigni", who claimed to be the last surviving member of the royal family of Silesia, to tutor their children four hours each day.

Death
Estes slipped and fell around the large pool at the family ranch hacienda in Van Nuys, California. He fell into a coma and never recovered. According to his death certificate (Los Angeles County D/C #6879), and due to his service in the Spanish–American War, Estes died at the Veterans Administration Hospital, West Los Angeles, California,  He and his wife, Esther Estes, are buried at Holy Cross Cemetery, Culver City, California.

Publications

See also
 Arnold Ehret
 Norman W. Walker
 Herbert M. Shelton
 Ann Wigmore
 Raw foodism
 Raw veganism
 Juicing

References

External links

 The Evening Independent, St. Petersburg, Florida, 22 Feb 1926
 Time, "Medicine: Family and Food", 17 Dec 1934
 Life, 21 Nov 1938
 News Letter Journal, Newcastle Wyoming, 24 Nov 1938

American dentists
1876 births
Dietitians
Raw foodists
1951 deaths
Accidental deaths from falls
Pseudoscientific diet advocates